Hot Pursuit is an American drama television series starring Kerrie Keane and Eric Pierpoint, which aired from September 22 to December 28, 1984, on NBC.  It was written and directed by executive producer Kenneth Johnson.

Plot
James Wyler (Eric Pierpoint) and his wife Kate Wyler (Kerrie Keane) are an upper-middle class couple in Kentucky before the events in the series begin. Kate is a successful automotive engineer, while Jim is a practicing veterinarian. But then Kate is framed for murdering her boss, Victor Modrian (Bradford Dillman), and sentenced to prison.

In reality, Victor Modrian's evil wife Estelle (Dina Merrill) had orchestrated the murder using a lookalike for Kate. Estelle was furious at her husband for supporting research and development on a prototype for a new car that she feared would bankrupt their company.  Also, she suspected him for having an affair with Kate, which was untrue.  Jim discovers the homeless lookalike and determines to bring Estelle to justice, to which end he helps Kate escape from prison. They go on the run, tracking clues to the real culprits, while taking on odd jobs to finance their search. Estelle, discovering that Jim and Kate have escaped, hires one-eyed assassin and long time associate of Estelle, Alec Shaw (who in fact lost his eye in a physical conflict with Jim) and orders Kate's lookalike and/or Jim and Kate to be found, and murdered before Estelle's scheme is exposed.

Cast
Kerrie Keane as Kate Wyler
Eric Pierpoint as Jim Wyler
Michael Preston as Alec Shaw
Dina Merrill as Estelle Modrian

Episodes

External links

1984 American television series debuts
1984 American television series endings
1980s American drama television series
NBC original programming
Television series by Universal Television